Peshawar City Railway Station is one of two major railway stations in the Peshawar, Khyber Pakhtunkhwa, Pakistan. It is located on the Dilazak Road.

Services
The following trains originate/stop at Peshawar Cantonment station:

See also 
 Pakistan Railways
 List of railway stations in Pakistan
 Rawalpindi railway station
 Lahore railway station
 Quetta railway station
 Peshawar Cantonment railway station

References

Railway stations in Peshawar District
Railway stations on Khyber Pass line
Railway stations on Karachi–Peshawar Line (ML 1)